Echo word is a linguistic term that refers to a particular kind of reduplication which is a widespread areal feature in the languages of South Asia. Echo words are characterized by reduplication of a complete word or phrase, with the initial segment or syllable of the reduplicant being overwritten by a fixed segment or syllable. In most languages in which this phenomenon is present, echo words serve to express a meaning of "... and such; and things like that." In some cases the echo word may express a depreciative meaning as well.

Echo word usage is almost exclusively a feature of colloquial spoken speech. It is avoided in formal speech and writing in all languages.

For example, Tamil echo words are formed with a  sequence overwriting the onset and nucleus of the first syllable of the reduplicant . - with a short vowel is used if the first syllable of the original word or phrase has a short vowel; if the first vowel is long, - is used instead. E.g.:

Echo words in Hindi are typically created

with a fixed initial v:

When an echo word is formed from a word that already begins with v, complete identity between the base and reduplicant is avoided by overwriting with a different fixed segment :

Persian:

This kind of avoidance of complete identity is found in many languages with echo words. In some other languages, echo word formation simply fails in cases where an echo word's reduplicant portion would be identical to the base . This is claimed for some dialects of Tamil, for example, such that the echo word version of a word like கிழமை kizhamai "day of the week" is simply ineffable .

 identified twenty distinct regions within India which use different consonants or combinations of consonants in the formation of echo words. These include languages from the Dravidian, Indo-Aryan, Tibeto-Burman and Austroasiatic families. In general, Dravidian languages form echo words with velar-initial fixed syllables (gi- or ki-). Indo-Aryan languages typically use labial fixed onsets (ʋ-, p-, pʰ-, b-, or m-). Other languages of India often use coronal fixed onsets (s-, t-, or ʈ-) or mixed systems using both labial and coronal onsets. However, there is a great deal of overlap and complexity within these systems, and they resist simple classification. For example, as seen in the examples above, Hindi typically employs labial ʋ- for echo word formation, but to avoid base-reduplicant identity it makes use of coronal ʃ-.

Echo word formation is not restricted to languages of India. It also occurs in many languages of Pakistan, Afghanistan, Bangladesh, and other South Asian countries. Some reduplicative patterns in Persian and in Turkish and other Turkic languages have sometimes been classified as echo word formation as well.

A doctoral dissertation by A. Parimalagantham provides a detailed description of echo word usage in Tamil and Telugu

See also
 Hobson-Jobson, an Indian English expression adopted as the name of an Indian English dictionary.

Bibliography

References

Reduplication